Barney Graham may refer to:

 James Graham (baseball), Major League Baseball player
 Barney S. Graham, American immunologist, virologist and clinical trials physician